A Devil of a Woman is a 1951 Austrian drama film directed by Wolfgang Liebeneiner and starring Hilde Krahl, Kurt Heintel and Bruno Hübner. It was entered into the 1952 Cannes Film Festival.

Cast
 Hilde Krahl as Marei
 Kurt Heintel as Grenzjäger Florian
 Bruno Hübner as Anton Lechner
 Hermann Erhardt
 Franz Muxeneder
 Otto Bolesch
 Kurt Bülau
 Olga von Togni

See also
 Thy Name Is Woman (1924)
 Der Weibsteufel (1966)

References

External links

1951 films
1951 drama films
1950s German-language films
Austrian black-and-white films
Films directed by Wolfgang Liebeneiner
Austrian films based on plays
Austrian drama films